Nature's God may refer to:

God in Deism, that is used in the United States Declaration of Independence: "...the separate and equal station to which the Laws of Nature and of Nature's God entitle them..."
Nature god, or nature deity, a deity in charge of forces of nature
Nature's God (book), a book by Robert Anton Wilson in The Historical Illuminatus Chronicles
Nature’s God: The Heretical Origins of the American Republic (book), a book by Matthew Stewart (philosopher)